Khatyryk-Khomo is a rural locality (a selo) in Aryktakhsky Rural Okrug of Kobyaysky District in the Sakha Republic, Russia, located  from Sangar, the administrative center of the district, and  from Aryktakh, the administrative center of the rural okrug. Its population as of the 2002 Census was 2.

Climate
Khatyryk-Khomo has an extreme subarctic climate (Köppen climate classification Dwd). Precipitation is quite low in winters, being mostly concentrated in summer and early autumn.

References

Notes

Sources
Official website of the Sakha Republic. Registry of the Administrative-Territorial Divisions of the Sakha Republic. Kobyaysky District. 

Rural localities in Kobyaysky District